Events in the year 2017 in Bermuda.

Incumbents
 Monarch: Elizabeth II
 Governor: John Rankin
 Premier: Michael Dunkley (until 19 July) ; Edward David Burt (from 19 July)

Events
5 May – Same-sex marriage in Bermuda becomes legal 
17 to 26 June – the 2017 America's Cup was held on the Great Sound in Bermuda 
18 July – Bermudian general election, 2017

Deaths
15 May – David Saul, politician (b. 1939).

References

 
2010s in Bermuda
Years of the 21st century in Bermuda
Bermuda
Bermuda